Bush Pilot may refer to:

A pilot engaged in Bush flying
Air Queensland, formerly Bush Pilots Airways, an Australian airline which operated from 1951 until 1988
Bush Pilot (film), a 1947 Canadian-American film directed by Sterling Campbell